Teatro Luna is an all-Latina theatre ensemble based in Chicago. The group was founded by Coya Paz and Tanya Saracho in 2001 in response to their experiences with a lack of representation of Latinas in the media and theatre scene. Teatro Luna focuses on creating work with other Latinas that reflects a variety of Latina experiences. Since 2001 the group has created over 13 collaborative productions, including Generic Latina (2001) and MACHOS (2007). The company has performed in a variety of theatres across Chicago, and expanded to a location in Los Angeles in 2014.

History 
In 2000 Coya Paz and Tanya Saracho met at an audition and began discussing their observations of a lack of spaces for Latina actresses in the Chicago theatre scene and beyond. This led to a later meeting at a coffee shop where they discussed the idea of forming an all Latina theatre group that would create its own works based on Latina experiences. The original company consisted of Paz, Saracho, and ten women from varying Latina backgrounds. Together the company worked to put together shows that consisted of stories of each of the women that reflected the multitudes of stories and experiences in the Latina community. These pieces spoke against the stereotyping of Latinas into a few specific roles and experiences in the wider theatre community.

Collaborative process 
The collaborative process of creating pieces includes seven different steps in which the members of the group share their different ideas and experiences with the group and then come back with more structured research or scripts. They then work these pieces and ideas in smaller groups and approach the piece from multiple different angles. They then present these different approaches to the other members, who are welcome to try out their own ideas, and the group decides on the preferred approach. One member then scripts the 'official' version, but changes are continually made throughout the rehearsal and performance process.

Productions 
The first collaborative piece the company performed was Generic Latina in 2001. The play consists of 20 vignettes based on the personal experiences of the company member and each provide a different take on what it means to be a Latina. In 2003 the company performed their first single author play, Kita Y Fernanda, by founder Tanya Saracho. The company developed one of their hit shows, MACHOS, in 2007 in which they examined traditional Latino male gender roles and what it means to be a Latino man. The play was developed after conducting hundred of nationwide interviews with Latino men, but was performed by the all female company. In 2009 founder Coya Paz left the company and in 2010 she was followed by fellow founder Tanya Saracho.

In 2010 Teatro Luna performed GL 2010: Not Your Generic Latina to reassert themselves under new administration as well as address the changes in the lives of Latinas in the ten years since the company's founding. In 2013 the company partnered with playwright Emilio Williams to perform their first show written by a man, Your Problem With Men, at the world premiere in Chicago. Teatro Luna took this show with them to their new location in Los Angeles, Teatro Luna West, in 2014 for the west coast premiere. The company then took their collaborative show Luna Unlaced on tour across the nation to different colleges and theaters in 2013. In 2015 Teatro Luna premiered Generation Sex at their Los Angeles location after a year long workshop tour. In 2017 the company returned to Chicago to perform Lovesick, a collection of stories about the violence inflicted on Latina bodies as a part of the Chicago International Latino Theater Festival: Destinos.

Other projects 
In addition to their collaborative shows, Teatro Luna also supports individual works. In the company's early days they implemented SÓLOS Latinas Project in which they fostered the efforts of local Latina writers. This program was a collection of workshops in which the women worked on their own individual works and several were selected to be produced in the SÓLOS Latinas production in 2005. This project was followed by a second installment of workshops and stories in SÓLO Tú (2008).

The company also offers numerous labs for directing, new works, producing, and PlayLab for developing new playwrights. Teatro Luna also offers different workshops and classes year round in an effort to increase the availability of creative resources and training to Latinas. They also have labs and classes available for youth in the community.

The company also takes their shows and workshops on tours nationally and internationally in order to spread their message and increase awareness nation and world wide. Teatro Luna will visit a variety of locations such as universities, festivals, and private settings.

Production history 

*indicates Probaditas or workshop performances

Tours and workshops

References 

Theatre companies in Chicago